La Fete de Marquette is an annual summer festival in Madison, Wisconsin.

History  

The French-themed festival began in 2006. It is currently held at McPike Park on the east-side of Madison. The festival was canceled in 2020 and 2021, due to the Covid-19 pandemic.

Events

The four-day festival features local and national musical acts, as well as restaurant and craft beer offerings.

Music 

While many of the "Fete's" featured musicians are French-influenced, Musique Èlectronique, the festival's electronic music stage, has hosted numerous renowned DJs from across the world.

Notable past acts 

Kid Koala
Kevin Saunderson
Sonny Landreth
Dumpstaphunk
Dengue Fever
Charanjit Singh
Octo Octa
Big Sam
Sunny Jain
Ten Strings and a Goat Skin

Attendance

Over 40,000 were expected for the 2018 gathering, up from 30,000 in 2013.

Charity 
Proceeds from the free-to-attend event go to the local Wil-Mar Neighborhood Community Center. Since its inception in 2006, the festival has raised over $1.2 million for various neighborhood social programs.

See also 

 Art Fair on the Square
 Mifflin Street Block Party
 State Street Halloween Party
 Great Midwest Marijuana Harvest Festival
 Brat Fest

References

External links
La Fete de Marquette

Festivals in Wisconsin
Culture of Madison, Wisconsin